Oedebasis is a genus of moths of the family Erebidae. The genus was erected by George Hampson in 1902.

Species
Oedebasis longipalpis (Berio, 1959)
Oedebasis mutilata (Berio, 1966)
Oedebasis ovipennis Hampson, 1902
Oedebasis regularis Viette, 1971

References

Calpinae